PJ's Coffee of New Orleans is an American chain of retail coffeehouses. PJ's was founded with a single shop in the Carrollton neighborhood of New Orleans in September 1978 by Phyllis Jordan (thus the initials "PJ"). 
 It was formerly billed as "PJ's Coffee & Tea Co.". PJ's spread throughout the Greater New Orleans Area with company-owned outlets. Its first franchise, in Mandeville, Louisiana, in 1989, was successively followed by franchises in Hammond, Louisiana, and Picayune, Mississippi. PJ's then expanded across the Southeast and to other parts of the United States including California.

 Jordan sold the company in 2002 to Raving Brands, an Atlanta-based firm. However, in 2008, ownership of PJ's returned to New Orleans when it was acquired from Raving Brands by New Orleans Brew, LLC. In its aggressive courting of potential franchisees, the closely held company offers a training program for potential and current restaurateurs. PJ's brand of coffee is also available in selected supermarkets. 

PJ's has been cited for its customer loyalty and mentioned as a challenger to Starbucks, with which PJ's has a comparable menu. In 2004 PJ's announced an ambition to compete head-to-head with Starbucks on a national basis.

In 2009, PJ's was named the "preferred coffee" of the New Orleans Saints.

PJ's New Orleans Coffee revealed on 14 July 2020 its mid-year franchise growth figures approving a minimum of 11 franchise deals that have or would result in 15 different franchise locations. Nine of the 11 latest franchise deals are coming from franchisees in the brand 's innovative regions. Those areas include Monahans (Texas), McKinney (Texas), Platte City (Missouri), Columbus (Georgia), Addison (Texas), Orlando (Florida), Columbia (South Carolina), Palmview (Texas), Pensacola (Florida) and Dallas (Texas).

See also
 List of coffeehouse chains

Notes

External links

 PJ's company web site
 PJ's Facebook site
Top 10 Best coffee shops in uk 2021
Coffee brands
Coffeehouses and cafés in the United States
Food and drink companies of New Orleans
Fast-food chains of the United States
Restaurants established in 1978
1978 establishments in Louisiana